The 2016–17 North Caledonian Football League will be competed for by eight clubs playing fourteen matches each. Halkirk United were the defending champions. St Duthus returned to the league following an eleven-year absence and Inverness Athletic, a new team, were also admitted.

Teams

League table

Results
Teams play each other twice making a total of 56 games, with each team playing 14.

References 

North Caledonian Football League seasons